The San Lorenzo Formation is a Dapingian geologic formation of southern Bolivia. The dark gray, greenish, and black shale with thin intercalations of white-yellow quartzites were deposited in an open marine submarine fan environment.

Fossil content 
The formation has provided the following fossils:

 Didymograptus nitidus
 Dinorthis obispoensis
 Orthambonites calligramma
 Peelerophon oehlerti
 Tetragraptus quadribrachiatus
 Thysanopyge argentina
 Yutagraptus vdeflexus
 Phyllograptus cf. typus
 Dictyonema sp.
 Endoceras sp.
 Lecanospira sp.
 Megalaspidella sp.
 Pachendoceras sp.

See also 
 List of fossiliferous stratigraphic units in Bolivia

References

Further reading 
 R. Suárez Soruco. 1976. El sistema ordovícico en Bolivia. Revista Tecnica YPF Bolivia 5(2):111-123

Geologic formations of Bolivia
Ordovician System of South America
Ordovician Bolivia
Dapingian
Shale formations
Sandstone formations
Open marine deposits
Turbidite deposits
Ordovician southern paleotemperate deposits
Paleontology in Bolivia
Geology of Tarija Department